The 1961–62 Philadelphia Warriors season was the sixteenth season for the National Basketball Association franchise in Philadelphia, and the last before their relocation to San Francisco, California, for the following season.

Wilt Chamberlain had the most statistically dominating season in NBA history. Chamberlain led the league with an NBA record 50.4 points per game. In one eight-day stretch in January, Chamberlain participated in three games in which he scored at least 63 points per game. On March 2, 1962,  the Warriors played the New York Knicks in Hershey, Pennsylvania. Chamberlain had one of the most dominating performances in NBA history as he notched 100 points before 4,124 fans. The game was actually played at the Warriors' training facility. Despite his high scoring, Wilt did not win the NBA MVP that season. The award was given to Bill Russell. The Warriors finished second behind Russell's Boston Celtics with a 49–31 record. In the playoffs, the Warriors defeated the Syracuse Nationals in five games. Russell and Chamberlain met in the Eastern Division Finals. The series went for the full seven games. In Game 7, the Celtics' Sam Jones hit the winning shot with 2 seconds remaining.

Roster

Regular season
Wilt Chamberlain's 100-point game, named by the National Basketball Association as one of its greatest games, took place between the Philadelphia Warriors and the New York Knicks on March 2, 1962, at Hersheypark Arena in Hershey, Pennsylvania.

The Warriors won the game, 169–147, setting what was then a record for the most combined points in a game by both teams. But the game is most remembered for the 100 points scored by Warriors center Wilt Chamberlain, who set the NBA single-game scoring record. The next leading scorer for Philadelphia was Al Attles with 17 points. The Knicks' leading scorer was Guerin with 39 points.  In that game, Chamberlain also broke five other NBA scoring records, of which four still stand.

Season standings

Record vs. opponents

Game log

Player stats
Note: GP= Games played; MIN=Minutes; FG= Field Goals; FT= Free Throws; REB= Rebounds; AST= Assists; PTS = Points; AVG = Average

Playoffs

|- align="center" bgcolor="#ccffcc"
| 1
| March 16
| Syracuse
| W 110–103
| Paul Arizin (43)
| Wilt Chamberlain (25)
| Guy Rodgers (8)
| Philadelphia Civic Center6,937
| 1–0
|- align="center" bgcolor="#ccffcc"
| 2
| March 18
| @ Syracuse
| W 97–82
| Wilt Chamberlain (28)
| Wilt Chamberlain (26)
| Wilt Chamberlain (4)
| Onondaga War Memorial5,250
| 2–0
|- align="center" bgcolor="#ffcccc"
| 3
| March 19
| Syracuse
| L 100–101
| Wilt Chamberlain (40)
| Wilt Chamberlain (25)
| Guy Rodgers (9)
| Philadelphia Civic Center5,328
| 2–1
|- align="center" bgcolor="#ffcccc"
| 4
| March 20
| @ Syracuse
| L 99–106
| Wilt Chamberlain (29)
| Wilt Chamberlain (9)
| Guy Rodgers (7)
| Onondaga War Memorial
| 2–2
|- align="center" bgcolor="#ccffcc"
| 5
| March 22
| Syracuse
| W 121–104
| Wilt Chamberlain (56)
| Wilt Chamberlain (35)
| Guy Rodgers (10)
| Philadelphia Civic Center7,829
| 3–2
|-

|- align="center" bgcolor="#ffcccc"
| 1
| March 24
| @ Boston
| L 89–117
| Wilt Chamberlain (33)
| Wilt Chamberlain (31)
| Chamberlain, Arizin (3)
| Boston Garden
| 0–1
|- align="center" bgcolor="#ccffcc"
| 2
| March 27
| Boston
| W 113–106
| Wilt Chamberlain (42)
| Wilt Chamberlain (37)
| Guy Rodgers (10)
| Philadelphia Civic Center
| 1–1
|- align="center" bgcolor="#ffcccc"
| 3
| March 28
| @ Boston
| L 114–129
| Wilt Chamberlain (35)
| Wilt Chamberlain (29)
| Wilt Chamberlain (6)
| Boston Garden
| 1–2
|- align="center" bgcolor="#ccffcc"
| 4
| March 31
| Boston
| W 110–106
| Wilt Chamberlain (41)
| Wilt Chamberlain (34)
| Guy Rodgers (10)
| Philadelphia Civic Center
| 2–2
|- align="center" bgcolor="#ffcccc"
| 5
| April 1
| @ Boston
| L 104–119
| Wilt Chamberlain (30)
| Wilt Chamberlain (14)
| Guy Rodgers (9)
| Boston Garden
| 2–3
|- align="center" bgcolor="#ccffcc"
| 6
| April 3
| Boston
| W 109–99
| Wilt Chamberlain (32)
| Wilt Chamberlain (21)
| Guy Rodgers (10)
| Philadelphia Civic Center
| 3–3
|- align="center" bgcolor="#ffcccc"
| 7
| April 5
| @ Boston
| L 107–109
| Tom Meschery (32)
| Wilt Chamberlain (22)
| Guy Rodgers (8)
| Boston Garden
| 3–4
|-

Awards and honors
 Wilt Chamberlain, NBA All-Star Game
 Paul Arizin, NBA All-Star Game
 Tom Gola, NBA All-Star Game
 Wilt Chamberlain, NBA scoring champion
 Wilt Chamberlain, All-NBA First Team
 Wilt Chamberlain, NBA Leader, Rebounds, 2,052
 Wilt Chamberlain, NBA Leader, Points per Game, 50.4
 Wilt Chamberlain, NBA Record, Most Points in One Game (see Wilt Chamberlain's 100-point game)

Relocation to San Francisco
Following the season, the Warriors moved west to San Francisco after Edward Gottlieb sold the team to a Bay Area credit card company. Despite the loss, Philadelphia was without pro-basketball for just that one season. The Syracuse Nationals, who challenged the Warriors in the playoffs for many years, moved to Philadelphia in 1963, becoming the Philadelphia 76ers.

References

External links
 1961–62 Warriors on Basketball Reference

Golden State Warriors seasons
Philadelphia